Dakoda Shepley (born December 27, 1994) is a Canadian American football offensive tackle for the Indianapolis Colts of the National Football League (NFL). He was drafted by the Saskatchewan Roughriders of the Canadian Football League fifth overall in the first round in the 2018 CFL Draft. He spent time with the New York Jets of the National Football League in 2018. Shepley played university football at British Columbia.

Early years
Shepley attended Holy Names High School. His main sport was ice hockey and didn't start playing football until suffering a broken hand during his sophomore season. 

He enrolled at the University of British Columbia. He was redshirted in 2013. He was a four-year starter, playing right tackle and right guard. As a sophomore, he contributed to the team winning the Vanier Cup championship. As a senior, he was named a Canada West All-star at right tackle.

Professional career

New York Jets
Shepley was signed as an undrafted free agent by the New York Jets after the 2018 NFL Draft on May 4. He attended training camp and played three preseason games with the Jets before being released on August 31, 2018.

Saskatchewan Roughriders
Despite being signed by the New York Jets a week earlier, the Saskatchewan Roughriders of the Canadian Football League selected Shepley with the fifth overall pick in the 2018 CFL Draft. Shepley signed a two-year deal with the Roughriders in March 2019. Shepley made his CFL debut on June 13, 2019, against the Hamilton Tiger-Cats and started 14 games as a rookie. He was the unanimous selection for Saskatchewan Roughriders Most Outstanding Rookie. 

After the CFL canceled the 2020 season due to the COVID-19 pandemic, Shepley chose to opt-out of his contract with the Roughriders on August 25, 2020.

San Francisco 49ers
On August 29, 2020, Shepley signed with the San Francisco 49ers of the NFL. He was waived on September 5, 2020, and signed to the practice squad the next day. He was elevated to the active roster on December 12 and December 19, for the team's weeks 14 and 15 games against the Washington Football Team and Dallas Cowboys, and reverted to the practice squad after each game. He signed a reserve/future contract on January 4, 2021.

On August 31, 2021, the 49ers waived Shepley.

Seattle Seahawks
On September 1, 2021, the Seattle Seahawks claimed Shepley off waivers. Shepley played in 8 games during the regular season, blocking on the extra point unit. On August 31, 2022, the Seahawks waived Shepley as part of final roster cut downs.

Dallas Cowboys
On September 1, 2022, the Dallas Cowboys signed Shepley to their practice squad. He was promoted to the active roster on January 7, 2023, then waived two days later.

Indianapolis Colts
On January 10, 2023, Shepley was claimed off waivers by the Indianapolis Colts.

Personal life
Shepley portrayed Omega Red in Deadpool 2.  He also was a stunt and body double in Game Over, Man!

References

External links
 Saskatchewan Roughriders bio

1994 births
Living people
Canadian football offensive linemen
Players of Canadian football from Ontario
Seattle Seahawks players
Saskatchewan Roughriders players
Sportspeople from Windsor, Ontario
UBC Thunderbirds football players
Canadian players of American football
Dallas Cowboys players
Gridiron football people from Ontario
Indianapolis Colts players